The 1991 Tulane Green Wave football team was an American football team that represented Tulane University during the 1991 NCAA Division I-A football season as an independent. In their fourth year under head coach Greg Davis, the team compiled a 1–10 record.

Schedule

References

Tulane
Tulane Green Wave football seasons
Tulane Green Wave football